Out of the Dark... Into the Light is the second EP by German thrash metal band Kreator, released in 1988. The live tracks were recorded at Dynamo Club in Eindhoven, Netherlands in 1988. Late 1990s reissues of Terrible Certainty album feature this EP as bonus material.

The early American version came in a 12" cardboard box.

Track listing

The American vinyl version swaps the order of the studio tracks (one and two) and the live tracks (three to five), and adds a sixth track, "Gangland", a Tygers of Pan Tang cover.

Personnel
Kreator
Mille Petrozza – lead vocals, rhythm guitar
Jörg "Tritze" Trzebiatowski – lead guitar
Rob Fioretti – bass
Ventor – drums, backing vocals

Production
Harris Johns – producer, mixing
Kreator – producer
Phil Lawrence – paintings, cover painting
Manfred Eisenblatter, Buffo Schnädelbach – photography

References

External links
 Kreator Terrorzone: Out of the Dark ... Into the Light

Kreator albums
1988 EPs
Live EPs
Noise Records EPs
Thrash metal EPs